The Naumburg (Saale) tramway is a tramline forming part of the public transport system in Naumburg (Saale), a city in the federal state of Saxony-Anhalt, Germany.

History
Service with steam trams began on 15 September 1892. The network was electrified in 1907.

Tram operation was suspended on 19 August 1991 due to financial difficulties and declining numbers of passengers. In 1994,  of track was restored for weekend services, initially as a horsedrawn tram, with electric service resuming in 1995. Operation of the tramway was assumed by Naumburger Straßenbahn GmbH.

Daily services on parts of the former loop line began on 31 March 2007.

An extension of the line from Vogelwiese to Salztor was opened in 2017.

Lines 
The network formerly consisted of a loop line around Naumburg Cathedral. Today, the  line, numbered Linie 4, runs on parts of the former loop arrangement from Naumburg Hauptbahnhof to Salztor.

See also
List of town tramway systems in Germany
Trams in Germany

References

Notes

Further reading

External links

 Naumburger Straßenbahn  – includes English summary
 

Naumburg (Saale)
Naumburg (Saale)
Transport in Saxony-Anhalt
Metre gauge railways in Germany
Naumburg